Focus is the third studio album from Souls of Mischief. It was their first release on the independent Hieroglyphics Imperium Recordings label, and was released in 1999. For over a decade, it was a cassette and LP release, only available through the group's website; it has since been made available on digital music sites.

Critical reception
The New Rolling Stone Album Guide wrote that "sung melodies are still virtually absent, but the rapped hooks sound fresh enough to make Focus a welcome return to form."

Track listing
 "Pay Dues" (Tajai)
 "Shooting Stars" (Opio)
 "Way 2 Cold" (Phesto)
 "Groove 2 Nite" (Opio & Tajai)
 "Make Way" (A-Plus)
 "We Intersect" (A-Plus & Tajai)
 "A to the P" (A-Plus)
 "Bird's Eye View" (Opio)
 "Stealth Bombing (Shift the Sands)" (Phesto)
 "Step Off" (A-Plus)
 "Holler!" (Tajai)
 "Big Shit" (Opio & Tajai featuring Casual)

References

External links 
 Focus Review at Discogs

1998 albums
Souls of Mischief albums